Dorcadion carolisturanii is a species of beetle in the family Cerambycidae. It was described by Breuning in 1971.

References

carolisturanii
Beetles described in 1971